May Township is the name of two places in the U.S. state of Minnesota:
May Township, Cass County, Minnesota
May Township, Washington County, Minnesota

See also: May Township (disambiguation)

Minnesota township disambiguation pages